The sixth season of the American comedy television series It's Always Sunny in Philadelphia premiered on FX on September 16, 2010. It is the first season of the show to be filmed in high-definition. The season contains 14 episodes and concluded airing on December 9, 2010, with the hour-long Christmas special (which was produced for season 5, however aired as part of season 6). An additional episode called "The Gang Gets Successful" (production code IP06004) was produced for this season, but was not aired, despite scenes from the episode being included in promotional material for season 6. It was later re-edited with new scenes to create the season 7 episode "How Mac Got Fat".

Season synopsis
In this season, Mac fights against gay marriage after he discovers that Carmen (the trans woman he secretly dated in "Mac Is a Serial Killer" and first met in "Charlie Has Cancer") has had gender reassignment surgery and married someone else. Meanwhile, Dennis marries an old friend—then quickly divorces her and gets stuck with paying exorbitant alimony, and Charlie and Frank decide to exploit gay marriage by getting married themselves for benefits, only to find it a waste of time.

Later, the gang decides to buy a boat with the money made from their merchandise in "Paddy's Pub: Home of the Original Kitten Mittens," but, as usual, everything goes wrong. When a heat wave hits Philadelphia, Mac and Charlie restore an abandoned pool while Frank wreaks havoc at a public pool, and Dee and Dennis are accused of being "white trash" while trying to get a membership at a country club pool.

This season also sees Dee becoming pregnant and every male panicking over who could be the possible father (with the surprise revealed to be Carmen at the end of the season), Charlie finally getting the respect he deserves during a scheme to throw a surprise party for him, and the gang getting lost in the woods on the way to Atlantic City. The gang also puts a cynical spin on Christmas when it is discovered that all of their treasured memories of the holidays were masking the debauched events that happened around that time as well.

Cast

Main cast 
 Charlie Day as Charlie Kelly
 Glenn Howerton as Dennis Reynolds
 Rob McElhenney as Mac
 Kaitlin Olson as Dee Reynolds
 Danny DeVito as Frank Reynolds

Special guest cast
 René Auberjonois as Dr. Larry Meyers
 Dave Foley as Principal MacIntyre

Recurring cast
 Mary Elizabeth Ellis as The Waitress
 David Hornsby as Cricket
 Artemis Pebdani as Artemis
 Lance Barber as Bill Ponderosa
 Catherine Reitman as Maureen Ponderosa
 Travis Schuldt as Ben The Soldier
 Jimmi Simpson as Liam McPoyle
 Nate Mooney as Ryan McPoyle
 Lynne Marie Stewart as Bonnie Kelly
 Sandy Martin as Mrs. Mac
 Gregory Scott Cummins as Luther Mac
 Brian Unger as The Lawyer
 Chad L. Coleman as Z
 Brittany Daniel as Carmen
 Andrew Friedman as Jack Kelly

Guest stars
 Windell Middlebrooks as Nick
 Don Swayze as Ray
 Preston Elliott as himself
 Steve Morrison as himself
 Jason Sudeikis as Schmitty
 Tom Sizemore as Trucker
 Ryan Howard as himself
 Chase Utley as himself
 Kyle Davis as Lil' Kevin
 Cleo King as Nurse Wendy
 Pablo Schreiber as Ricky Falcone
 David Huddleston as Eugene Hamilton

Episodes

^  This episode is a direct to DVD, Blu-ray and digital download movie. It was released on November 17, 2009, and aired on December 16, 2010 on FX as the last episode of season 6. A video disclaimer on the Blu-ray release indicates it was not filmed in high definition, but was upconverted.

Reception
The sixth season received positive reviews. On Rotten Tomatoes, it has an approval rating of 94% with an average score of 8.3 out of 10 based on 16 reviews. The website's critical consensus reads, "Cleverly folding Kaitlyn Olson's real-life pregnancy into the plot with characteristic perversity, It's Always Sunnys sixth season sees the Gang trying – and failing – to grow up."

Home media

References

External links 

 
 

2010 American television seasons
It's Always Sunny in Philadelphia